Valli is the Goddess consort of the Hindu God Murugan.

Valli may also refer to:

People
 Alida Valli (1921-2006), sometimes known simply as Valli, Italian actress
 Celso Valli (born 1940), Italian composer, arranger and record producer
 Éric Valli (born 1952), French photographer and film director
 Eusebio Valli (1755-1816), Italian physician and electrical researcher
 Frankie Valli (born 1934), Italian-American musician
 Geoff Valli (born 1954), New Zealand rugby union player
 Romolo Valli (1925-1980), Italian actor 
 Valli Valli (1882-1927), English actress
 Viola Valli (born 1972), Italian swimmer
 Virginia Valli (1898-1968), American actress
 Valli O'Reilly, makeup artist (also known as Aunt Valli and Valle O'Reilly)

Places
 Valli, Estonia
 Valli, Iran

Arts and entertainment
 Valli (film), 1993 Indian Tamil-language film starring Rajinikanth
 Valli (album), 1976 album by Frankie Valli

See also
Vall (surname)
Vali (disambiguation)